Swiss Racing Team (SRT) is an auto racing team based in Inwil, Lucerne, Switzerland.  Formed by Othmar Welti and Erich Kolb in 2000, Swiss Racing Team initially competed in the German Formula Three Championship before also joining the Formula Three Euroseries from 2003 to 2004. Frédéric Vervisch won the German Championship in 2008 earning SRT their only championship.  In 2007 the team also explored grand tourer racing, providing technical aid to Jetalliance Racing and KplusK Motorsport in the FIA GT Championship.

In 2010 Swiss Racing Team entered a partnership with Nissan to be one of two teams to race the Nissan GT-R in the inaugural FIA GT1 World Championship.  SRT's drivers for the World Championship include Karl Wendlinger, former FIA GT Championship race winner with both Jetalliance and KplusK, former SRT Formula Three driver Max Nilsson, Le Mans winner Seiji Ara, and Henri Moser.

In 2011, the team announced they will be racing a pair of Lamborghini Murciélago's for the upcoming season, replacing the Nissan GT-R's. Karl Wendlinger and Max Nilsson are currently the only confirmed drivers to be signed with SRT for their upcoming 2011 programme.

Former series results

Formula 3 Euro Series

† Shared results with Signature Plus

German Formula 3

† – Shared results with other teams
‡ – As Limmonen was a guest driver, he was ineligible for points.

British Formula 3

‡ – As Muermans was a guest driver, he was ineligible for points.

References

External links
 Swiss Racing Team

Swiss auto racing teams
FIA GT1 World Championship teams
Formula 3 Euro Series teams
British Formula Three teams
German Formula 3 teams
European Rally Championship teams
Auto racing teams established in 2000